José Calderón is the name of:

José Luis Calderón (born 1970), Argentine footballer
José Calderón (Panamanian footballer) (born 1985), Panamanian footballer
José Luis Calderón Cabrera (died 2004), Mexican architect
José Calderón (basketball) (born 1981), Spanish basketball player
José Calderón (Mexican footballer) (born 1993), Mexican footballer

See also
 José Manuel Calderón (disambiguation)